Marie-Martine is a 1943 French drama film directed by Albert Valentin and starring Renée Saint-Cyr, Jules Berry and Saturnin Fabre. It was shot at the Photosonor Studios in Paris. The film's sets were designed by the art director Jean Perrier.

Synopsis
Just released from prison after a false accusation of murder, Marie-Martine attempts to rebuild her life. However her hopes to get married are threatened by a blackmailing novelist.

Cast
 Renée Saint-Cyr as Marie-Martine
 Jules Berry as 	Le romancier Loïc Limousin
 Saturnin Fabre as 	L'oncle Parpain
 Bernard Blier as Maurice
 Marguerite Deval as 	Mademoiselle Aimée
 Jeanne Fusier-Gir as 	Mademoiselle Crémier
 Sylvie as La mère de Maurice
 Héléna Manson as	Madame Limousin
 Jean Debucourt as 	Monsieur de Lachaume
 Michel Marsay as 	Philippe Ponthieu
 Frédéric Mariotti as 	Ernest - le garçon de café
 Hélène Constant	as	Hélène

References

Bibliography
 Bertin-Maghit, Jean Pierre. Le cinéma français sous Vichy: les films français de 1940 à 1944. Revue du Cinéma Albatros, 1980.

External links 
 

1943 films
1940s French-language films
1943 drama films
French drama films
Films directed by Albert Valentin
1940s French films